

Events

January–March 
 January 6 – Abolitionist William Lloyd Garrison founds the New-England Anti-Slavery Society. 
 January 13 – The Christmas Rebellion of slaves is brought to an end in Jamaica, after the island's white planters organize militias and the British Army sends companies of the 84th regiment to enforce martial law.  More than 300 of the slave rebels will be publicly hanged for their part in the destruction.
 February 6 – The Swan River Colony is renamed Western Australia.
 February 9 – The Florida Legislative Council grants a city charter for Jacksonville, Florida.
 February 12
 Ecuador annexes the Galápagos Islands.
 A cholera epidemic in London claims at least 3,000 lives; the contagion spreads to France and North America later this year.
 February 28 – Charles Darwin and the crew of  arrive at South America for the first time.
 March 24 – In Hiram, Ohio, a group of men beat, tar and feather Mormon leader Joseph Smith.

April–June 
 April 6 – The Black Hawk War begins in the United States.
 May 7 – The Treaty of London creates an independent Kingdom of Greece. Otto of Wittelsbach, Prince of Bavaria, is chosen King; thus begins the history of modern Greece.
 May 10 – The Egyptians, aided by Maronites, seize Acre from the Ottoman Empire after a 7-month siege.
 May 11 – Greece is recognized as a sovereign nation; the Treaty of Constantinople ends the Greek War of Independence in July.
 May 16 – Juan Godoy discovers the rich silver outcrops of Chañarcillo sparking the Chilean silver rush.
 May 30
 The Hambacher Fest, a demonstration for civil liberties and national unity in Germany, ends with no result.
 The Rideau Canal in eastern Ontario (Canada) is opened.
 June 5–6 – The June Rebellion in France, anti-monarchist riots led chiefly by students, breaks out in Paris.
 June 7 – The Reform Act becomes law in the United Kingdom, expanding the franchise.
 June 9 – The Strasburg Rail Road is incorporated by the Pennsylvania State Legislature, making it the oldest continuously operating railroad in the Western Hemisphere.

July–September 
 July 1 – Global conglomerate Jardine Matheson is founded in Canton (modern day Guangzhou) in Qing dynasty China by Scottish merchants.
 July 2 – André-Michel Guerry presents his Essay on moral statistics of France to the French Academy of Sciences, a significant step in the founding of empirical social science.
 July 4 – Durham University is founded in the north of England by an act of Parliament given royal assent by King William IV.
 July 9 – The Commissioner of Indian Affairs post is created within the United States Department of War.
 July 10 – The United States Survey of the Coast is revived within the Department of the Treasury.
 August 2 – The Bad Axe Massacre ends the last major Native American rebellion east of the Mississippi in the United States.
 August 7 – William Howley, Archbishop of Canterbury, has his coach attacked by an angry mob on his first official visit to Canterbury because of his opposition to the Reform Act in the United Kingdom.
 August 27 – Black Hawk (Sauk leader) surrenders to the United States authorities, ending the Black Hawk War.
 September 22 – Qasim al-Ahmad is appointed as the new Ottoman Governor (mutasallim) of Jerusalem (Kudüs), after Sultan Mahmud II dismisses Muhammad Said Agha.

October–December 
 October 4 – Prince Otto of Bavaria, the second oldest son of King Ludwig I, is selected by Europe's major powers to become Othon, the first King of Greece, after the Hellenic nation's reacquisition of independence.
 October 20 – Principal Chief Levi Colbert (Itawamba Mingo) and other leaders of the Chickasaw Nation of American Indians sign the Treaty of Pontotoc Creek with the United States, ceding their remaining 9,400 square miles of land to the U.S., in return for a promise that they will receive all proceeds of sales of the land by the federal government to private owners, along with expenses for relocation and food and supplies for one year.  The area ceded includes the entire northern one-sixth of the state of Mississippi.
 November 21 – Wabash College, a small, private, liberal arts college for men, is founded.
 November 24 – Nullification Crisis: The U.S. state of South Carolina passes the Ordinance of Nullification, challenging the power of the U.S. federal government, by declaring that it will not enforce national tariffs signed into law in 1828 and 1832. 
 December 3 – 1832 United States presidential election: Andrew Jackson is re-elected president.
 December 4 – Siege of Antwerp: The last remaining Dutch stronghold, Antwerp Citadel, comes under French attack in the aftermath of the Belgian Revolution.
 December 10 – U.S. President Andrew Jackson responds to the Nullification Crisis by threatening to send the U.S. Army and Navy into South Carolina if it does not comply.
 December 21 – Battle of Konya: The Egyptians defeat the main Ottoman army in central Anatolia.
 December 23 – The Siege of Antwerp ends with the Dutch garrison losing the citadel.
 December 28 – John C. Calhoun becomes the first Vice President of the United States to resign.

Date unknown 
 George Catlin starts to live among the Sioux in the Dakota Territory.
 The first Baedeker guidebook, Voyage du Rhin de Mayence à Cologne, is published in Koblenz.
 Publication begins (posthumously) of Carl von Clausewitz's Vom Kriege ("On War").
 The City of Buffalo in New York is incorporated.
 The Cumberland and Oxford Canal connects the largest lakes of southern Maine with the seaport of Portland, Maine.
 Global watch brand Longines is founded in Switzerland.
 The first commutator DC electric motor, capable of turning machinery, is demonstrated by William Sturgeon in London.

Births

January–June 

 January 1 – Tom Jeffords, US Army scout and Indian agent (d. 1914)
 January 4 – Sir George Tryon, British admiral (d. 1893)
 January 6 – Gustave Doré, French painter, sculptor (d. 1883)
 January 13 – Horatio Alger, Jr., American Unitarian minister, author (d. 1899)
 January 23 – Édouard Manet, French painter (d. 1883)
 January 26 – George Shiras Jr., Associate Justice of the Supreme Court of the United States (d. 1924)
 January 27 – Lewis Carroll, English author (d. 1898)
 January 28 – Sir Charles Gough, British general, Victoria Cross recipient (d. 1912)
 January 28 – T. Muthuswamy Iyer, Lawyer, first Indian Judge of the Madras high court (d. 1895)
 February 9 – Adele Spitzeder, German actress, folk singer and confidence trickster (d. 1895)
 February 18 – Octave Chanute, French-American engineer, aviation pioneer (d. 1910)
 April 3 – James Sewall Reed, American soldier (d. 1864)
 April 5 – Jules Ferry, French premier (d. 1893)
 April 8 – Howell Edmunds Jackson, American politician, Associate Justice of the Supreme Court of the United States (d. 1895)
 April 14 – Wilhelm Busch, German humorist, poet, illustrator and painter (d. 1908)
 April 15 – John Irwin, American admiral (d. 1901)
 April 19
 José Echegaray, Spanish writer, Nobel Prize laureate (d. 1916)
 Lucretia Garfield, First Lady of the United States (d. 1918)
 May 14 – Charles Peace, English criminal (d. 1879)
 May 21 – Hudson Taylor, English founder of the China Inland Mission (d. 1905)
 May 22 – Laura Gundersen, Norwegian actor (d. 1898)
 May 27 – Alexandr Aksakov, Russian writer (d. 1903)
 June 9 – Martha Waldron Janes, American minister, suffragist, columnist (d. unknown)
 June 10 – Nicolaus Otto, German engineer (d. 1891)
 June 12 – Pierre Théoma Boisrond-Canal, Haitian politician, 12th President of Haiti (d. 1905)
 June 17 – Sir William Crookes, English chemist, physicist (d. 1919)

July–December 

 July 6 – Emperor Maximilian I of Mexico (d. 1867)
 July 11 – Charilaos Trikoupis, 7-time Prime Minister of Greece (d. 1896)
 July 26 – Joseph P. Fyffe, American admiral (d. 1896)
 August 2 – Henry Steel Olcott, American officer (d. 1907)
 August 8 – George, King of Saxony (d. 1904)
 August 20 – Thaddeus S. C. Lowe, American aeronaut, scientist and inventor (d. 1913)
 October 1 – Caroline Harrison, First Lady of the United States (d. 1892)
 October 2 – Sir Edward Tylor, English anthropologist (d. 1917)
 October 3 – Richard Meade, Lord Gilford, British admiral (d. 1907)
 October 4 – Thorborg Rappe, Swedish social reformer (d. 1902)
 October 10 – Joe Cain, American parade organizer for Mardi Gras in Mobile, Alabama (d. 1904)
 October 23
 Grand Duke Michael Nikolaevich of Russia, fourth son and seventh child of Tsar Nicholas I of Russia and Charlotte of Prussia (d. 1909)
 Johan Gabriel Ståhlberg, Finnish priest and father of K. J. Ståhlberg, the first President of Finland (d. 1873)
 October 29 – Narcisa de Jesús, Ecuadorian-born philanthropist, lay hermit, sainted (d. 1869)
 November 1 – Gyula Szapáry, Hungarian politician, 10th Prime Minister of Hungary (d. 1905)
 November 7 – Andrew Dickson White, American historian, diplomat and co-founder of Cornell University (d. 1918)
 November 12 – Nancy Edberg, Swedish pioneer of women's swimming (d. 1892)
 November 18 – Adolf Erik Nordenskiöld, Finnish-Swedish geologist and explorer (d. 1901)
 November 26 – Mary Edwards Walker, American physician (d. 1919)
 November 28 – Sir Leslie Stephen, English writer, critic (d. 1904)
 November 29 – Louisa May Alcott, American author (d. 1888)
 December 6 – Thaddeus C. Pound, American businessman and politician (d. 1914)
 December 8 – Bjørnstjerne Bjørnson, Norwegian author, Nobel Prize laureate (d. 1910)
 December 13 – Alexander Milton Ross, Canadian abolitionist (d. 1897)
 December 14 – Ana Betancourt, Cuban national heroine (d. 1901)
 December 15 – Gustave Eiffel, French engineer (d. 1923)
 December 21 – John H. Ketcham, American politician (d. 1906)

Date unknown 
 Naimuddin, Bengali writer and Islamic scholar (d. 1907)

Deaths

January–June 

 January 26 – Alexander Cochrane, British admiral (b. 1758)
 January 27 – Andrew Bell, Scottish educationalist, founder of Madras College, India (b. 1753)
 February 2 – Ignacio López Rayón, leader of the Mexican War of Independence (b. 1773)
 February 3 – George Crabbe, English poet and naturalist (b. 1754)
 March 4 – Jean-François Champollion, French Egyptologist (b. 1790)
 March 10 – Muzio Clementi, Italian composer and pianist (b. 1752)
 March 15 – Otto Wilhelm Masing, Estonian linguist (b. 1763)
 March 22 – Johann Wolfgang von Goethe, German writer (b. 1749)
 March 29 – Maria Theresa of Austria-Este, Queen of Sardinia (b. 1773)
 April 3 – Jean Baptiste Gay, vicomte de Martignac, Prime Minister of France (b. 1778)
 April 12 – Shadrach Bond, American politician and the first governor of Illinois (b. 1773)
 April 18 – Jeanne-Elisabeth Chaudet, French painter (b. 1761)
 May 13 – Georges Cuvier, French zoologist (b. 1769)
 May 23 – William Grant, British lawyer, politician and judge (b. 1752)
 May 28 – Nicolas Bergasse, French lawyer (b. 1750)
 May 31 – Évariste Galois, French mathematician (b. 1811)
 June 1 – Jean Maximilien Lamarque, French general and politician (b. 1770)
 June 5 – Kaʻahumanu, queen consort of Hawaii (b. 1768)
 June 6 – Jeremy Bentham, English philosopher (b. 1748)
 June 10 – Joseph Hiester, American politician (b. 1752)
 June 21 – Princess Amalie of Hesse-Darmstadt (b. 1754)
 June 23 – James Hall, Scottish geologist (b. 1761)

July–December 

 July 22 – Napoleon II of France (b. 1811)
 July 31 – Edward Abbott, Australian soldier, politician and judge (b. 1766)
 August 24 – Nicolas Léonard Sadi Carnot, French military engineer and physicist (b. 1796)
 September 1 – Joseph Kinghorn, Particular Baptist Minister (b. 1766)
 September 2 – Franz Xaver von Zach, Austrian scientific editor and astronomer (b. 1754)
 September 21 – Sir Walter Scott, Scottish poet and novelist (b. 1771)
 September 27 – Karl Christian Friedrich Krause, German philosopher (b. 1781)
 October 11 – Thomas Hardy, British political reformer (b. 1752)
 October 31 – Antonio Scarpa, Italian anatomist (b. 1752)
 November 8 – Marie-Jeanne de Lalande, French astronomer and mathematician (b. 1768)
 November 12
 Henry Eckford, Scottish-born American shipbuilder, naval architect, industrial engineer, and entrepreneur (b. 1775)
 Barnaba Oriani, Italian priest (b. 1752)
 November 14 – Charles Carroll of Carrollton, signer of the United States Declaration of Independence and U.S. Senator (b. 1737)
 November 15 – Jean-Baptiste Say, French economist, originator of Say's law (b. 1767)
 December 18 – Philip Freneau, American poet and journalist (b. 1752)
 undated – Birgithe Kühle, Norwegian journalist (b. 1762)

References 

 

Leap years in the Gregorian calendar